Yaniv Green (born May 16, 1980) is an Israeli retired professional basketball player. Green is a 2.04 m (6 ft 9 in) tall forward-center. He is the most capped player in the history of the Israeli national basketball team, with 189 appearances.

Israeli national team
Yaniv was a main factor in the surprising second-place finish of the U-20 Israeli national team at the 2000 FIBA Europe Under-20 Championship. He was also a part of the team that played at the FIBA Under-21 World Championship and finished in 7th place.

Green has played in every European championship, from Eurobasket 2001 to Eurobasket 2015, making a total of 8 championships.
At Eurobasket 2007, Green was the leading rebounder, averaging 9.3 rebounds per game. His highest performance was pulling 16 rebounds in a second stage match against Croatia.

On 10 September 2015, Green played his 189th match for the national team, making him the most capped player in Israeli national team history, after passing former leader Doron Jamchi. He also managed to get 1,478 points which placed him in the top 5 of the all-time points leaders of the national side.

Averages

2005-06
Euroleague- 22 Games, 6.3 Minutes, 2.1 Points, 1.0 Rebounds, 0.2 Assists

Ligat Winner- 32 Games, 13.1 Minutes, 5.2 Points, 3.6 Rebounds, 0.8 Assists

2006-07
Euroleague- 19 Games, 7.5 Minutes, 3.0 Points, 2.0 Rebounds, 0.4 Assists

Ligat Winner- 24 Games, 13.3 Minutes, 7.3 Points, 3.5 Rebounds, 0.6 Assists

References

External links
Euroleague.net Profile

Israeli men's basketball players
1980 births
Living people
Bnei Hertzeliya basketball players
Centers (basketball)
Hapoel Tel Aviv B.C. players
Israeli Basketball Premier League players
Israeli people of Polish-Jewish descent
Jewish men's basketball players
Maccabi Ra'anana players
Maccabi Tel Aviv B.C. players
People from Herzliya
Power forwards (basketball)
Israeli people of Romanian-Jewish descent
Hapoel Jerusalem B.C. players
Lega Basket Serie A players
Israeli expatriates in Italy
Hapoel Gilboa Galil Elyon players